Joseph Lawrence Hooper (December 22, 1877 – February 22, 1934) was a politician from the U.S. state of Michigan.

Hooper was born in Cleveland, Ohio on December 22, 1877 and moved to Michigan with his parents, who settled in Battle Creek, Michigan in 1891. He attended the public schools, studied law, was admitted to the bar in 1899, and commenced practice in Battle Creek.  He was circuit court commissioner of Calhoun County, 1901–1903; prosecuting attorney of Calhoun County, 1903–1907; and city attorney of Battle Creek, 1916–1918. He was also a Congregationalist and a member of the Freemasons.

Hooper was elected as a Republican from Michigan's 3rd congressional district to the 69th United States Congress to fill the vacancy caused by the death of Arthur B. Williams.  He was reelected to the 70th and to the three succeeding Congresses, serving from August 18, 1925, until his death in Washington, D.C. He was interred in Oak Hill Cemetery in Battle Creek.

See also
 List of United States Congress members who died in office (1900–49)

References

Sources

Books

External links

Joseph L. Hooper at The Political Graveyard

1877 births
1934 deaths
American Congregationalists
Republican Party members of the United States House of Representatives from Michigan